Stenseby is a small settlement near St Bodil's Church in the southeast of the Danish island of Bornholm. For a time, an active community grew up around Bodilsker Station on the Rønne–Nexø railway which operated from 1900 to 1968. The area is also known for its passage grave discovered in the 1880s.

Archeological finds
J. A. Jørgensen, a schoolteacher from Ibsker, was Bornholm's most active archeologist in the late 19th century. In 1882, he investigated the Stenseby passage grave from the Neolithic where he discovered a few hundred amber beads, several flint tools, including a 5-inch knife, a sandstone axe and a decorated pot. Not far from Stenseby, he investigated another site, Bønnestenen. Further finds were made in the 1920s including a Bronze Age pot.

References

Bornholm
Archaeological sites in Denmark
Villages in Denmark